SMK Sultan Badlishah (Sultan Badlishah National Secondary School; abbreviated SMKSB) is a secondary school in Kulim, Kedah, Malaysia. Established in 1948, it is one of the oldest schools in Kedah. It is also designated as a cluster school by the Ministry of Education.

History
The school began as the Government English School on 8 January 1948, at the Kedah Volunteer Force Drill Hall. It is the third English-medium school to be established in Kedah and the first secondary school to be established in southern Kedah (catering the Kulim, Baling and Bandar Baharu districts). The idea to establish the school was initiated and led by Syed Omar bin Syed Abdullah Shahabuddin, the then Kulim District Officer. Prior to the school's establishment, parents have no choice but to send their children to secondary schools in Bukit Mertajam or Sungai Petani.

In 1953, the school became known as Badlishah School taking the name of Sultan Badlishah of Kedah, in conjunction with the Sultan's visit the year before. The school name became  Sultan Badlishah School in 1959.

The school celebrated its Silver Jubilee in 1973 and its Golden Jubilee in 1998, officiated by the Kulim District Officer, Tuan Syed Harun Al Jafree and the Minister of Education, Dato' Sri Najib Razak respectively.

Principals
 1948 to 1956: Samsudin bin Mohd Yusuf
 1956 to 1958: Leong Lan Oyee
 1958 to 1961: Chn'g Lum Tong
 1961 to 1962: Saad bin Lazim
 1962 to 1965: David Singh
 1966 to 1969: Ong Leng Gin
 1969 to 1974: J. P. Augustin
 1974 to 1975: Chiam Tah Wen
 1975 to 1979: Abd Wahab bin Ghani
 1979 to 1983: G. Rajagopal
 1984 to 1993: Harun bin Rejab
 1993 to 1995: Mat Rejab bin Che Mat
 1995 to 2012: Azizah binti Rasol
 2012 to 2013: Zaharah binti Ishak
 2013 to 2017: Ommi Kalsom binti Haji Ibrahim
 2017 to 2020: Yazi bin Yusof
 2020 to current: Saniah binti Che Omar

Notable alumni
 Abdul Kadir bin Sheikh Fadzir - MP for Kulim-Bandar Baharu (1986 to 2008), Minister of Culture, Arts and Tourism (1999 to 2004), Minister of Information (2004 to 2006)
 Alauddin bin Mohd Sheriff - President of the Court of Appeal (2008 to 2011)
 Raja Ariffin bin Raja Sulaiman - MP for Baling (1986 to 1999), Deputy Minister in the Prime Minister's Department (1987 to 1996)

References

External links
  ::SMK SULTAN BADLISHAH - 

Secondary schools in Malaysia
1948 establishments in Malaya
Educational institutions established in 1948